MDHOET, or 3,4-methylenedioxy-N-hydroxyethylamphetamine, is a lesser-known psychedelic drug and a substituted amphetamine.  It is also the N-hydroxyethyl analogue of MDA.  MDHOET was first synthesized by Alexander Shulgin. In his book PiHKAL (Phenethylamines i Have Known And Loved), the minimum dosage is listed as 50 mg.  MDHOET produces few to no effects. Very little data exists about the pharmacology, pharmacokinetics, effects, and toxicity of MDHOET.

Legality

United Kingdom
This substance is a Class A drug in the Drugs controlled by the UK Misuse of Drugs Act.

See also 
 Phenethylamine
 Psychedelics, dissociatives and deliriants
 Substituted methylenedioxyphenethylamine

References

External links 
 MDHOET entry in PiHKAL
 MDHOET entry in PiHKAL • info
 DEA reports about various MDHOET seizures in Europe and USA

Psychedelic phenethylamines
Benzodioxoles
Primary alcohols